The 5th New York Regiment was authorized on November 30, 1776, as part of the New York Line for service with the Continental Army, under Colonel Lewis DuBois. It was organized January 26, 1777, from companies in central New York and assigned to the Highlands Department.

The 5th New York was badly mauled at the Battle of Fort Montgomery and Fort Clinton Oct. 6th 1777 with near two-thirds their number killed or captured after a grueling day-long battle.

The regiment would see further action in the Hudson Highlands and the Sullivan Expedition.

The regiment would be merged into the 2nd New York Regiment on January 1, 1781.

Legacy 

In 2001, a living history regiment reenacting the 5th New York Regiment was raised in Orange County, NY.  The reenactment 5th New York Regiment is currently active all throughout the Hudson Valley and based at its home garrison, Fort Montgomery.

Notes and references

Sources
 Heitman, Francis B., Historical Register of Officers of the Continental Army during the War of the Revolution. New, enlarged, and revised edition., Washington, D.C.: Rare Book Shop Publishing Company, 1914
 Wright, Robert, The Continental Army, 1983
 [5thny.org 5th New York Regiment’s website], 2013

External links
Bibliography of the Continental Army in New York compiled by the United States Army Center of Military History

New York (state) regiments of the Continental Army
Military units and formations established in 1776